The Oradell Reservoir is a reservoir formed by the Oradell Reservoir Dam on the Hackensack River in Bergen County, New Jersey, United States.

Geography
The Oradell Reservoir Dam is located primarily in the borough of Oradell, but the reservoir also extends across the borders of the nearby boroughs of Haworth, Emerson, Closter, and Harrington Park. The reservoir is fed by the Upper Hackensack River, the Pascack Brook and Dwars Kill. The reservoir feeds the Lower Hackensack River via the Oradell Dam. Upstream from the Oradell Reservoir are three other reservoirs: Woodcliff Lake Reservoir, also in Bergen County; Lake DeForest in Rockland County in New York; and Lake Tappan, traversing the borders of Bergen and Rockland counties across the state line. The Oradell Dam was constructed to supply potable water to northern New Jersey and has essentially separated the Hackensack River into two distinct components: the upper river (above the dam) and the lower river (below the dam).

There is only one bridge to cross the reservoir, which carries CR 502 (Old Hook Road) over from Harrington Park to Closter. It is located in the northern part of the lake and is very important because it saves drivers from having to drive around the reservoir, avoiding the need to drive through towns and residential neighborhoods.

The reservoir is transversed by a CSX Transportation bridge carrying crude oil.

History
Construction on the Oradell Reservoir began in 1901 by the dredging of a mill pond. The mill pond dam was replaced in 1911 by a low timber-crib dam that increased reservoir storage. The reservoir was completed in 1923. The Oradell Reservoir and its tributaries are currently protected with Category 1 water purity status in New Jersey. The reservoir is managed by United Water New Jersey, a unit of  Suez North America, a private utility. It provides drinking water for an estimated 750,000 residents of Bergen and Hudson counties.

Because of its environment, the Oradell Reservoir area is very susceptible to flooding. During many storms, such as Hurricane Sandy in 2012 and Hurricane Ida in 2021, the reservoir as well as connecting streams flooded the area and caused many roads to flood and be closed. The bridge that carries Old Hook Road (CR 502) across is considerably low to the surface, and so is often flooded, resulting in closures to the road.

See also
List of crossings of the Hackensack River

References

External links
Suez North America

Closter, New Jersey
Harrington Park, New Jersey
Oradell, New Jersey
Bodies of water of Bergen County, New Jersey
Reservoirs in New Jersey
Hackensack River
Dams in New Jersey
Dams completed in 1923
United Water
Crossings of the Hackensack River
1923 establishments in New Jersey